Salima Elouali Alami (born 29 December 1983) is a Moroccan athlete. She was born in Karia Ba Mohamed. She competed in the 3000 metres steeplechase at the 2012 Summer Olympics, placing 26th with a time of 9:44.62.

References

External links

1983 births
Living people
Moroccan female steeplechase runners
Olympic athletes of Morocco
Athletes (track and field) at the 2012 Summer Olympics
Athletes (track and field) at the 2016 Summer Olympics
World Athletics Championships athletes for Morocco
Mediterranean Games silver medalists for Morocco
Athletes (track and field) at the 2013 Mediterranean Games
Mediterranean Games medalists in athletics
20th-century Moroccan women
21st-century Moroccan women